Lieutenant General Richard "Riri" Oscar Roger Åkerman (6July 1898 – 23June 1981) was a Swedish Army officer. He was Chief of the Defence Staff from 1951 to 1957 and military commander of the III Military District from 1957 to 1963, when he retired.

Early life
Åkerman was born on 6 July 1898 in Stockholm, Sweden, the son of the lieutenant general and politician Joakim (Jockum) Åkerman and Martina Björnstjerna. He passed studentexamen in Stockholm in 1916.

Career

Military career
Åkerman was commissioned as a second lieutenant in Svea Artillery Regiment (A 1) in 1919 and lieutenant in 1923. Åkerman became captain of the General Staff in 1931 and was General Staff officer of the Western Army Division from 1931 to 1933. Åkerman was then head of the Air Defense Office in the General Staff from 1934 to 1937 and artillery battery commander of Svea Artillery Regiment from 1937 to 1939. Åkerman was major in the General Staff Corps in 1939 and teacher at the Royal Swedish Air Force Staff College the same year.

He left the Swedish Army in 1939 and joined the Finnish Army during the Winter War as part of the Swedish Volunteer Corps. Åkerman was promoted to major in the Finnish Army and then lieutenant colonel in 1940. He was then again major of the Swedish General Staff Corps in 1940. Åkerman was again teacher at the Royal Swedish Air Force Staff College from 1941 to 1942 and strategy teacher at the Royal Swedish Army Staff College from 1940 to 1942. He became a lieutenant colonel in 1941 and colonel in 1943.

Åkerman was head of the Royal Swedish Army Staff College from 1942 to 1946 and commander of the Östgöta Anti-Aircraft Regiment (Lv 2) from 1946 to 1948. He was promoted to colonel in the Swedish Air Force and was appointed Inspector of the Control and Reporting System of the Swedish Air Force (Inspektören för luftbevakningen) in 1948. Åkerman was promoted to major general and was appointed Chief of the Defence Staff in 1951. He was also serving as head of the Swedish National Defence College from 1951 to 1952. Åkerman left the Defence Staff in 1957 and was then military commander of the III Military District from 1957 to 1963 when he was promoted to lieutenant general.

Other work
Åkerman was part of the 1930 Defense Commission in 1935 and the 1941 Defense Investigation. He was a member and secretary of the Commission concerning the voluntary acquisition of air defense equipment in 1937, of the King in Council and was representative of the executive committee of Sweden's Landstorm Federations Central Association (Sveriges Landstormsföreningars Centralförbunds verkställande utskott) from 1938 to 1942. Åkerman became a member of the Royal Swedish Academy of War Sciences in 1942. He was chairman of the Bromma Air Protection Association (Bromma luftskyddsförening) from 1944. Åkerman was vice chairman of the central association Society and Defence from 1951 to 1957, chairman of the board of the insurance company Allmänna livförsäkringsbolaget Oden from 1958 to 1959 and the local board of the commercial bank Skaraborgs enskilda bank in Skövde from 1958 to 1969. Furthermore, he was board member of the insurance companies Svenska liv in 1960, Städernas försäkringsbolag in 1964 and Hansa from 1967 to 1969. Åkerman was also chairman of Skaraborg County's district of the Swedish Red Cross from 1964 to 1973.

Personal life
In 1920, Åkerman married Thyra Sellén (1899–1988), the daughter of professor, lieutenant colonel Nils Sellén and Ragnhild Frisk. He was the father of Joachim (1921–1994), Elsie (born 1923) and Thyra (born 1926).

Death
Åkerman died on 23 June 1981 and was buried 6 October 1981 in Norra begravningsplatsen in Stockholm.

Dates of rank

Swedish Army/Air Force
1919 – Second lieutenant
1923 – Lieutenant
1931 – Captain
1939 – Major
1941 – Lieutenant colonel
1943 – Colonel
1948 – Colonel (Swedish Air Force)
1951 – Major general
1963 – Lieutenant general

Finnish Army
1939 – Major
1940 – Lieutenant Colonel

Awards and decorations

Swedish
   Commander Grand Cross of the Order of the Sword (6 June 1958)
  Knight of the Order of the Polar Star
  Knight of the Order of Vasa
  National Aerial-Protection Association's Medal of Merit (Riksluftskyddsförbundet förtjänstmedalj)
  National Aerial-Protection Association's Badge of Merit in gold (Riksluftskyddsförbundets förtjänsttecken i guld)
  Landstorm Gold Medal (Landstorm-guldmedalj)

Foreign
   Commander 1st Class of the Order of the Dannebrog
   Commander 1st Class of the Order of the White Rose of Finland
   Commander with Star of the Order of St. Olav (1 July 1955)
   Commander of the Legion of Honour
   Order of the Cross of Liberty, 3rd Class with swords
  Finnish War Commemorative Medal

References

1898 births
1981 deaths
Swedish Army lieutenant generals
Military personnel from Stockholm
Members of the Royal Swedish Academy of War Sciences
Commanders Grand Cross of the Order of the Sword
Knights of the Order of Vasa
Knights of the Order of the Polar Star
Volunteers in the Winter War
Burials at Norra begravningsplatsen
20th-century Swedish military personnel
Chiefs of the Defence Staff (Sweden)